The flea flicker is an unorthodox "trick play" in American football.

Flea flicker may also refer to:
Fleaflicker (website), an online fantasy sports platform
Operation Flea Flicker, part of the Iraqi coalition counter-insurgency operations
A type of jig in fly fishing
A brand of monofilament fishing line